Peder Hjort or Peder Hiort (1715 – 1 August 1789) was a Norwegian businessperson.

Peder Pedersen Hjort was born in the mining town of  Røros in Sør-Trøndelag as the youngest  of six children. His family originated in Schleswig-Flensburg. He attended the Trondheim Cathedral School and was trained at the University of Copenhagen as a theologian graduating in 1737.

In 1743, he was appointed to a position with the Copper Works at Røros. In 1762, he assumed the position of magistrate, which his father held before him. He also became assistant mining director followed in 1772 as director of the mines.  At that time,  this was one of the most valuable mines in Norway. The operation consisted of several mines and  smelters. In 1768, he became a member of Royal Norwegian Society of Sciences and Letters after he had authored Historiske Efterretninger om Røros Kobberverk, a report about the history of the Røros copper plant.

References

External links
Røros Copperworks
Hiort chapel

1715 births
1789 deaths
18th-century Norwegian businesspeople